André Saeys (born 20 February 1911 in Sint-Andries - 22 March 1988 in Sint-Andries) was a Belgian football player. He was a striker. He played numerous seasons at the highest level of Belgian football and was also capped 9 times for Belgium.

Saeys made his debut for Cercle Brugge in 1928 in a match against Berchem Sport. Cercle won the match 0–2. He won the league with Cercle one season later.

In 1935, André Saeys went to RC Wetteren, where he would stay one season. Beerschot became Saeys's next team. With the purple-white Antwerp side, Saeys won the league again twice, in 1938 and 1939.

Saeys made his debut for Belgium in a match against the Netherlands on 9 April 1933. Belgium lost the match 1–3. Saeys made the Belgian goal.

External links
 Cerclemuseum.be 
 

1911 births
1988 deaths
Belgian footballers
Belgium international footballers
1930 FIFA World Cup players
Association football forwards
Footballers from Bruges
Belgian Pro League players
Cercle Brugge K.S.V. players
K. Beerschot V.A.C. players